George A. Draper (November 4, 1855 – February 7, 1923) was an American textile industrialist.

Biography

Early life
George Albert Draper was born on November 4, 1855, in Hopedale, Massachusetts. He was a descendant of early Massachusetts settler James Draper. He had a brother, Eben Sumner Draper, who went on to serve as the 44th Governor of Massachusetts from 1909 to 1911.

At the age of seventeen, Draper entered the Massachusetts Institute of Technology, where he studied for two years.

Career
He joined his father's businesses as treasurer at Hopedale Machine Company and later at the Draper Company.

He was President of the Grafton and Upton Railroad, and of the Harmony Mills; director in the Milford National Bank, First National Bank of Boston, Brogon Cotton Mills Company, of Anderson, North Carolina, and of the Calhoun Cotton Mills of Calhoun, North Carolina.

Death
He died on February 7, 1923.

Legacy
His son Wickliffe Draper inherited his fortune and used it to begin the Pioneer Fund.

References

 

1855 births
1923 deaths
People from Hopedale, Massachusetts
American railroad executives
Businesspeople from Massachusetts
Massachusetts Institute of Technology alumni
19th-century American businesspeople